Brooks Phillip Victor Newmark (born 8 May 1958) is a British Conservative politician and former Member of Parliament and minister. He was elected as the Member of Parliament for Braintree in the 2005 general election and stood down at the 2015 general election.

Prior to entering politics, he was involved in various businesses and was a senior partner at a private equity firm. Newmark is a visiting academic at the University of Oxford and became a guest lecturer in politics after his parliamentary career ended.  He is a founder of the charity 'A Partner in Education', a campaigner on homelessness and a member of the Rough Sleeping Advisory Panel that advises the Home Office.

Early life
Newmark was born in Westport, Connecticut, in the United States, on 8 May 1958 to Howard Newmark and Gilda Gourlay (née Rames). He is of Jewish heritage. He moved to the UK aged nine and attended Caldicott Preparatory School and Bedford School. He graduated from Harvard College, receiving a BA in History in 1980 and was a member of the Delphic Club. He was a Research Graduate in Politics at Worcester College, Oxford, from 1980 to 1982, and has an MBA in Finance from Harvard Business School and an MSc in Education from Oxford University.

Business interests
Newmark was vice president in the International Division of Shearson Lehman Brothers from 1984 to 1987, a managing director of Newmark Brothers Ltd, a corporate finance advisory company, from 1988 to 1993, and then a director of Stellican Ltd from 1993 to 1998. From 1998 to 2005, Newmark was a senior partner at Apollo Management (UK) LP, an international private equity firm.

He was a director of Telesis Management Ltd and AAA MIP Limited. He has been a director of Connaught Brown since 2015 and a director of the Catholic Herald since 2016 among other appointments.

Parliamentary career
Newmark contested Newcastle Central in 1997, and Braintree in 2001. He was elected as the Member of Parliament for Braintree (in mid Essex) in the 2005 general election over the Labour incumbent, Alan Hurst, and was re-elected in 2010 with a greater majority.

He served as a Government Whip for Office of the Deputy Prime Minister, Department for International Development, Department for Business, and Innovation & Skills. In opposition, Newmark served as the Foreign Affairs Whip (2009–10) and Treasury Whip (2007—08). Newmark had previously served as a Member of the Treasury Select Committee (2006—07) and the Science & Technology Select Committee (2005—07). Newmark was re-elected onto the Treasury Select Committee in 2012 after 5 years in the Whips' Office. In mid July 2014, Newmark was appointed as the Minister for Civil Society, in the Cabinet Office. In response to a question, following his first public speech in that role, he said that charities should "stick to their knitting" and "keep out of the realm of politics". It was later argued that these quotations were taken out of context, and in fact suggested that politicians should support charities, but not interfere.

During his time as an MP, Newmark co-founded and co-chaired Women2Win, an organisation established to encourage women into politics and public service. He also co-founded the Million Jobs Campaign to address the need for more to be done regarding youth unemployment.

Newmark resigned as Minister for Civil Society on 27 September 2014, a day before the Conservative Party Conference in Birmingham. David Cameron accepted Newmark's resignation following allegations, published by the Sunday Mirror, that he had been sexting with a ‘female party activist’ who was in fact a male undercover reporter who was posing as a female to deliberately target Newmark, having failed with various other male MPs, over social media.

Fellow Conservative MP Mark Pritchard announced that he would make a formal complaint against the newspaper saying that "questionable techniques" had been involved in the paper's report. An IPSO investigation later cleared the Sunday Mirror of any wrongdoing in an announcement that came three weeks after the regulator was formed. Following a new "text-and-tell story" in October 2014 involving a young mother, Newmark announced he would not seek re-election to Parliament in the forthcoming general election.

Life after Parliament
Newmark is currently a research associate at the University of Oxford in the Department of Politics and International Relations. He is also guest lecturing at the Said Business School on private equity, and travels to universities outside the UK to lecture in either politics or finance. He is the author of various articles on the war in Syria, Brexit, US politics and homelessness.

He has authored a report on homelessness at the Centre for Social Justice think tank. The report highlighted the long-term nature of homelessness, the growth of ‘tent cities’ and the normalisation of rough sleeping.

Political views
Newmark's interests include: Economic Policy, Foreign Affairs (Middle East, India, China and USA); Poverty Reduction & International Development (Micro Finance), Special Needs Education and Women & Equality (Founder and Co-Chairman of Women2Win).

Publications include: Direct Democracy: An Agenda for a New Model Party (2005); Simply Red; The True State of the Public Finances (CPS, 2006); The Price of Irresponsibility (CPS, 2008) and the Hidden Debt Bombshell (CPS, 2009).

Charity work
Newmark is involved with charity work in Rwanda and also helps homeless charities. In 2009 Newmark co-founded the charity A Partner in Education, which helps Rwandan teachers to give the nation's children an improved education.  It supports training for teachers and provides an inclusive environment for children. The charity has built a school in Rwanda that caters for over 300 children.

Newmark is involved in various charities including PARC, a respite centre based in Braintree for children with severe disabilities, and Farleigh Hospice and has volunteered for the Braintree Salvation Army and the homeless charity Crisis in London.

Personal life
He is married to Lucy Keegan, daughter of the military historian Sir John Keegan, and has four sons and one daughter, actress Lily Newmark.

He is a practising Catholic, and along with Rocco Forte and William Cash owns the Catholic Herald.

References

External links
 
 Guardian Unlimited Politics - Ask Aristotle: Brooks Newmark MP
 Brooks Newmark (The Telegraph)
 Brooks Newmark MP ( Westminster Parliamentary Research)
 
 Contributor page at The Guardian

1958 births
Living people
Alumni of Worcester College, Oxford
American emigrants to England
20th-century American Jews
Conservative Party (UK) MPs for English constituencies
English Jews
Harvard Business School alumni
Jewish British politicians
People educated at Bedford School
People from Westport, Connecticut
Political sex scandals in the United Kingdom
UK MPs 2005–2010
UK MPs 2010–2015
Ministers for Civil Society
Harvard College alumni
21st-century American Jews
Free Enterprise Group